Elizabeth Parr-Johnston, CM (born Elizabeth H. Parr in 1939 in New York, NY) is a Canadian business woman. She is the Managing Partner of Parr-Johnston Consultants, an economic policy consultancy based in Chester Basin, Nova Scotia. Parr-Johnston is a past president of two Canadian Universities, a recipient of the 125th Anniversary of the Confederation of Canada Medal in 1992, the Queen Elizabeth II Golden Jubilee Medal in 2002 and the Order of Canada in 2008.

Raised in Essex Fells, New Jersey, she attended Grover Cleveland High School (since renamed as James Caldwell High School).

Professional career

Academia and civil service
In 1962, after completing her Masters in Economics from Yale University, Parr-Johnston moved to Canada. She taught Economics at the University of Western Ontario, Huron College, the University of British Columbia and Carleton University. Parr-Johnston would relocate to the United States of America briefly in 1971 to teach at her father’s alma mater, Wesleyan University before returning to Canada to join the federal civil service in various capacities over the next 5 years. In 1974, Parr-Johnston completed her doctoral work and earned her PhD in Economics from Yale University.

Private sector
Parr-Johnston accepted the position of Senior Policy Analyst and Director of Government Affairs at Inco in 1976 where she remained for 3 years. She returned to the private sector in 1980, joining Shell Canada where she held numerous senior positions over her 10-year tenure.

Employment & Immigration Canada
In 1979, Parr-Johnston won a political appointment as the Chief of Staff to Ron Atkey, the Canadian Minister of Employment and Immigration during the short-lived Conservative minority government. Among her many accomplishments at the Ministry, Parr-Johnston was involved in the secret extraction of six American Embassy workers who escaped to the safety of the Canadian Embassy in Tehran during the Iran hostage crisis.

Mount Saint Vincent University
In 1991, Parr-Johnston was installed as the 8th President and Vice-Chancellor of Mount Saint Vincent University in Halifax, Nova Scotia. She served a full five-year term, leading Canada’s only university dedicated primarily to the education of women. On June 16, 1995, coinciding with the 21st G7 summit taking place in Halifax, Parr-Johnston awarded an honorary Doctor of Letters to First Lady of the United States of America, Hillary Clinton, a fellow alumna of Wellesley College. The mount has established an endowed scholarship in the name of Parr-Johnston.

University of New Brunswick
Parr-Johnston was installed as the 16th President of the University of New Brunswick in Fredericton, New Brunswick in 1996. She completed one full six-year term in office before retiring to Nova Scotia with her husband Archie. In 2004, Parr-Johnston returned to UNB and was awarded an honorary Doctor of Letters for her contributions to the field of education. UNB named a student residence after Parr-Johnston.

Boards of directors and trustees
 Scotiabank
 Emera Incorporated
 Canadian Research Institute for Social Policy 
 Millennium Scholarships
 W.L. Mackenzie King Memorial Scholarships
 FutureGenerations Canada
 Sustainable Development Technology Canada
 National Theater School
 Council of Canadian Academies
 Empire Company Limited
 Chester Golf Club
 FPI Limited

Equalization
On March 20, 2005, the Canadian Minister of Finance announced the appointment of Parr-Johnston to the Independent Panel for Equalization and Territorial Formula Financing. The purpose of the panel was to examine the existing system of federal transfer payments to the provinces and to recommend necessary changes to the process.  The final report was delivered to the Minister in May 2006 and was adopted in its entirety by the Prime Minister of Canada.

Order of Canada
On February 22, 2008, Parr-Johnston was installed by the Governor General of Canada as a Member of the Order of Canada, Canada’s highest civilian honour. Parr-Johnston was recognized for her lifetime contributions to the field of education. The Investiture Ceremony programme read as follows:

For decades, Elizabeth Parr-Johnston has made important contributions to the educational and voluntary sectors in Canada. As president of two universities in Atlantic Canada, she was highly respected for creating increased opportunities for women, notably by mentoring female faculty and by making education more accessible to women. Her expertise and wise counsel have been sought by public, private and community boards including those of the Canadian Millennium Scholarship Foundation, the Atlantic Institute for Market Studies and Symphony Nova Scotia. As head of her own consulting company, she continues to contribute to public policy development in Canada.

Education
 Grover Cleveland High School – Valedictorian, 1957
 Wellesley College – B.A. Economics, 1961 (ΦΒΚ),(Woodrow Wilson Fellow)
 Yale University – M.A. Economics, 1962
 Yale University – PhD Economics, 1974
 Harvard Business School – Advanced Management Program
 University of New Brunswick – D.Litt. (Honorary), 2004

Personal life
Parr-Johnston is the oldest child of F. Van S. Parr, Jr. and Helene Parr. Her late father was the Senior Partner of Whitman & Ransom and former National President of the Chi Psi (ΧΨ) Fraternity. Her brother, Dr. Grant V.S. Parr, is the former Chief of Cardiothoracic surgery at Atlantic Health. Her sister, Sally Cerny was an Instructor of Psychology at Rutgers University.

On March 9, 1982, at the Royal Canadian Military Institute in Toronto, Ontario, Parr-Johnston married Archibald F. Johnston, former Vice President of General Electric. Between them, they have six children, all from prior marriages. Archie died on January 23, 2010. Currently, Parr-Johnston resides in Halifax, Nova Scotia.

References

External links

Biographies
 Scotiabank
 Sustainable Development Technology Canada
 Millennium Scholarships
 LinkedIn.com

Addresses
 Address to Couchiching Conference, 1993
 Best Practices for Audit Committee Effectiveness – October 2006

1939 births
Living people
People from Essex Fells, New Jersey
Canadian university and college chief executives
Harvard Business School alumni
James Caldwell High School alumni
Members of the Order of Canada
Wellesley College alumni
Wesleyan University faculty
Yale University alumni
Academic staff of the University of Western Ontario
Academic staff of the University of British Columbia
Academic staff of Carleton University
Directors of Scotiabank
Canadian corporate directors
Canadian women in business
Canadian women academics
American women academics
Women heads of universities and colleges
21st-century American women